Association football, or soccer, as it is typically called in South Africa, is the nation's most popular sport and South Africa national soccer team (Bafana Bafana) is the nation's favourite sports team followed by rugby union and cricket. The governing body is the South African Football Association (SAFA), while the Premier Soccer League is the organisation responsible for running the country's two professional divisions, namely the South African Premier Division and the National First Division. The main cup competitions are the Nedbank Cup, Telkom Knockout, and the MTN 8 Cup.

History
Soccer first arrived in South Africa through colonialism in the late nineteenth century, as the game was popular among British soldiers. From the earliest days of the sport in South Africa until the end of apartheid, organised soccer was affected by the country's system of racial segregation. The all-white Football Association of South Africa (FASA), was formed in 1892, while the South African Indian Football Association (SAIFA), the South African Bantu Football Association (SABFA) and the South African Coloured Football Association (SACFA) were founded in 1903, 1933 and 1936 respectively.

In 1903 the SAFA re-affiliated with the English The Football Association after the Second Boer War between the British Empire and the Boer states. There was a plan to play a tournament held in Argentina, with South Africa and Fulham as guest teams, but it was not carried out. Nevertheless, South Africa traveled to South America in 1906 to play a series of friendly matches there.

South Africa played a total of 12 matches in South America, winning 11 with 60 goals scored and only 7 conceded. Some of the rivals were Belgrano A.C., Argentina national team, a Liga Rosarina combined, Estudiantes (BA) and Quilmes. The only team that could beat South Africa was Argentine Alumni by 1–0 at Sociedad Sportiva stadium of Buenos Aires, on 24 June, although the South African would take revenge on 22 July, defeating Alumni by 2–0.

The players were exclusively white, civil servants, government employees, bankers and civil engineers. Seven of the 15 players were born in South Africa and 8 originated from England and Scotland.

South Africa was one of four African nations to attend FIFA's 1953 congress, at which the four demanded, and won, representation on the FIFA executive committee. Thus the four nations (South Africa, Ethiopia, Egypt and Sudan) founded the Confederation of African Football in 1956, and the South African representative, Fred Fell, sat at the first meeting as a founding member. It soon became clear however that South Africa's constitution prohibited racially mixed teams from competitive sport and so they could only send either an all-black side or an all-white side to the planned 1957 African Cup of Nations. This was unacceptable to the other members of the Confederation and South Africa were disqualified from the competition, however some sources say that they withdrew voluntarily.

At the second CAF conference in 1958 South Africa were formally expelled from CAF. The all-white (FASA) were admitted to FIFA in the same year, but in August 1960 it was given an ultimatum of one year to fall in line with the non-discriminatory regulations of FIFA. On 26 September 1961 at the annual FIFA conference, the South African association was formally suspended from FIFA. Sir Stanley Rous, president of The Football Association of England and a champion of South Africa's FIFA membership, was elected FIFA President a few days later. Rous was adamant that sport, and FIFA in particular, should not embroil itself in political matters and against fierce opposition he continued to resist attempts to expel South Africa from FIFA. The suspension was lifted in January 1963 after a visit to South Africa by Rous in order to investigate the state of soccer in the country.

Rous declared that if the suspension were not lifted, soccer there would be discontinued, possibly to the point of no recovery. The next annual conference of FIFA in October 1964 took place in Tokyo and was attended by a larger contingent of representatives from African and Asian associations and here the suspension of South Africa's membership was re-imposed. In 1976, after the Soweto uprising, they were formally expelled from FIFA. South Africa was suspended by FIFA from 1961 to 1992 because of the country's apartheid policies, banning the country from international competition (including the FIFA World Cup), and severely stunting the growth of the domestic game.

In 1991, when the apartheid system was beginning to be demolished, a new multi-racial South African Football Association was formed, and admitted to FIFA. On 7 July 1992, the South African national team played their first game in two decades, beating Cameroon 1–0. Since the integration of the country, it has developed the most sophisticated professional soccer structure in Africa, the Premier Soccer League. South Africa qualified for the 1998 and 2002 World Cups, but failed to progress past the group stage both times. They hosted (and won) the 1996 African Cup of Nations and hosted the 2010 World Cup, the first African nation to do so.

South African soccer leagues structure

Football association

The first non-racial, singular football association in South Africa was formed in 1991, and named the South African Football Association (SAFA). Previously, there had been a number of different, racially divided football bodies. These bodies, the Football Association of South Africa, the South African Soccer Association, the South African Soccer Federation and the South African National Football Association came together to form SAFA on 8 December 1991. SAFA was given observer status at the Confederation of African Football in January 1992. The association was accepted into FIFA in June 1992, allowing its teams to play international matches.

SAFA currently control all national soccer teams, and most soccer leagues in South Africa. The notable exceptions are the Premier Soccer League and the National First Division, the top two leagues in the country. The leagues are controlled by the National Soccer League, which also controls most major cup competitions.

League system

South Africa has a number of different soccer leagues, controlled by different organisations. The top two leagues are professional or semi-professional, and run by the PSL. The lower leagues are mostly amateur, and run by SAFA.

South African Premier Division

The Premier Soccer League was founded in 1996, as a merger between the National Premier Soccer League and the National Soccer League. The Premier Division is the current top league in South Africa, with the winner being crowned as the national champion. The league is made up of 16 teams, all of which are professional. At the end of each season one team is automatically relegated to the National First Division, a second team may also be relegated through a play-off. The relegated teams are replaced by one or two teams from the National First Division.

National First Division

The National First Division is the current second tier in South African soccer. The league is made up of 16 teams, which are either professional or semi-professional. The league is governed and controlled by the same body which runs the Premier Soccer League. The league winner is automatically promoted to the Premier Soccer League at the end of the season. Another highly placed team may also be promoted through a play-off. At the end of the season two bottom clubs are relegated, and replaced by two play-off winners from the ABC Motsepe League.

SAFA Second Division

The SAFA Second Division is the third tier of South African soccer, and the highest tier directly controlled by the South African Football Association. The league is played on a provincial basis, and made up mostly of semi-professional sides. 144 clubs are divided into nine, 16 team leagues. At the end of the season the nine league winners enter into a series of play-offs to earn the two promotion places in the National First Division. The bottom two teams in each league are relegated to the SAB Regional League.

SAB Regional League

The SAB Regional League is the fourth tier of South African soccer, and the second highest tier controlled by the South African Football Association. The league is made up of 832 clubs, divided into 52 leagues. Each of the 52 leagues is associated with one of the nine provincial leagues in the SAFA Second Division, and are usually amateur teams. The regional league winners enter into a series of play-offs in their province, to gain two places in each provincial league in the SAFA Second Division.

LFA Soccer Leagues
Leagues below the SAB Regional League are controlled by SAFA's Local Football Associations. The number of teams and leagues at this level can vary greatly depending on the area and the population. Teams in these leagues are almost always amateur.

Youth Soccer Leagues

There are several different youth soccer leagues, organised along geographic lines. The main youth competition is the U19 National League, run along local football association lines.

Tertiary Soccer
Most universities in South Africa include soccer programs for both men and women. Most clubs play in the amateur leagues, competing against non-university sides. The exception is in the Gauteng province, where clubs play in the Gauteng Football League.

The two largest university soccer tournaments are the USSA Football tournament and Varsity Sports Football Challenge. The USSA tournament is open to all universities, and allows separate teams for different campuses. The Varsity Sports tournament is only open to universities aligned to the University Sports Company, and only allows one club per university.

The University of the Witwatersrand formerly ran a club, Bidvest Wits, who competed in the South African Premier Division, and University of Pretoria runs a professional club, Tuks F.C., which play on their campuses and campaign in the National First Division. Maluti FET College F.C. competes in the SAFA Second Division.

Schools Soccer
There are also several leagues for high school and junior school soccer teams, however many private and former model C schools have controversially chosen not to include soccer programs. One of the largest national schools soccer tournament is the Kay Motsepe Schools Cup.

Cup competitions
The Nedbank Cup is South Africa's main soccer cup, and is modeled on England's FA Cup. The cup is open to teams from the Premier Soccer League down to the SAB Regional Leagues.

The Telkom Knockout is the country's League Cup, and open only to PSL teams.

The MTN 8 is a Super Cup and played between the top eight finishers from the previous season's PSL.

The Baymed Cup is a defunct cup competition, which was open to National First Division

National teams

Senior teams

The South Africa national team or Bafana Bafana (a Zulu term of endearment which means the boys, the boys) is the national team of South Africa and is controlled by the South African Football Association (SAFA). They returned to the world stage in 1992, after years of being banned by FIFA due to the apartheid system. The team has played at seven Africa Cup of Nations tournaments, winning once. The team has also played at three FIFA World Cups including, 1998 in France and 2002 in South Korea and Japan. South Africa became the first African nation to host the FIFA World Cup when it hosted the 19th FIFA World Cup in June 2010. The team's Siphiwe Tshabalala was also the first person to score in this World Cup during the opening game against Mexico. Despite defeating France 2–1 in their final game of the group stage, they failed to progress from the first round of the tournament, becoming the first host nation to do so. South Africa had participated in the FIFA Confederations Cup of 1997 and hosted in 2009. The team's highest achievement was winning the Africa Cup of Nations at home in 1996.

The men's development team is made up mainly of players from South Africa's lower leagues. The team plays matches in the COSAFA Cup and African Nations Championship.

The women's team has played at nine African Women's Championships and had a best finish of second place, which it accomplished four times, most recently in 2012. The team played at home during the 2010 African Women's Championship, and finished in third place, the third time South Africa has hosted the competition. South Africa made the FIFA Women's World Cup for the first time ever in 2019, ironically also in France, where the men's team made its debut 21 years ago.

Junior teams
There are three men's youth teams:
 Amaglug-glug (under 23)
 Amajita (under 20)
 Amajimbos (under 17)

and two women's youth teams:
 Basetsana (under 20)
 Bantwana (under 17)

International tournaments
South Africa has hosted a number of large scale football tournaments. These include:

 1994 COSAFA U-17 Cup
 1996 African Cup of Nations
 1999 All-Africa Games Football tournament
 1999 COSAFA U-20 Cup
 1999 UEFA–CAF Meridian Cup
 2000 African Women's Championship
 2000 COSAFA U-20 Cup
 2001 COSAFA U-17 Cup
 2001 COSAFA U-20 Cup
 2002 COSAFA U-17 Cup
 2002 COSAFA U-20 Cup
 2003 COSAFA U-20 Cup
 2004 African Women's Championship
 2004 COSAFA U-20 Cup
 2005 COSAFA U-20 Cup
 2005 COSAFA Cup (co-host)
 2006 COSAFA U-20 Cup
 2007 COSAFA U-20 Cup
 2007 COSAFA Cup (co-host)
 2008 COSAFA U-20 Cup
 2008 COSAFA Cup
 2009 FIFA Confederations Cup
 2009 COSAFA U-20 Cup
 2010 FIFA World Cup
 2010 African Women's Championship
 2011 African Youth Championship
 2013 Africa Cup of Nations
 2014 African Nations Championship

South African players abroad
While most South African footballers play for local clubs, some professional players play in other countries.

The following is a list of South Africans playing in foreign leagues:

Foreign players in South Africa

+50,000-capacity South African soccer venues

References

South Africa 1987

Further reading